Leo Koffler (1879—1931) (full name Leon Bernhard Koffler, also known as Oskar Koffler) was a screenwriter, actor and singer. Living and working in Berlin in the beginning of the 20th century, he was one of the pioneers of cinema.

Life 
Koffler was born on June 7, 1879, in Zurawno, near Lemberg, now Lviv, Ukraine, when the city was in the Austrian-Hungarian Empire.  His family moved to Vienna in 1882, where he received his education.  He made his Abitur and became an opera singer.  In 1911 he became the director of a theatre in Colmar, Alsace which was then in the German Empire (now in France).

In 1914 he moved to Berlin.  He sang in a number of musicals and operas including Das Dreimäderlhaus, and Hänsel and Gretel at the Theater des Westens.  Koffler also played small parts in many movies.

In 1916 he was conscripted into the Austro-Hungarian K and K regiment.  This was just at the point when he started to establish a reputation for himself. At the end World War I, Koffler moved back to Berlin in 1918, and started working in movies again, including work with a small Hungarian film company called Viktor Klein. It was in this period that when he wrote a number of film-scripts for Fritz Lang, including Der Herr der Liebe and Halbblut.

In his later years, his health declined and finally he could not work any more.  Nevertheless, almost until the day he died he sang at the Fasanenstrasse Synagogue in Berlin.

Leo Koffler died on February 16, 1931, in Berlin.

Works
1919 Phantome des Lebens, screenplay
1919 Der Herr der Liebe, screenplay
1919 Das Gift im Weibe, screenplay
1919 Halbblut, screenplay
1920 Die 3 weissen Teufel (Das Weltgewissen), screenplay
1920 New York - Paris (Spionagekonzern) part 1, screenplay
1920 New York - Paris (Spionagekonzern) part 2, screenplay
1920 Der Tiger von Sing Sing, actor
1920 Die entfesselte Menschheit, actor
1920 Der Shawl der Kaiserin Katharina II, actor
1921 Fortunato 1. "Der tanzende Dämon", actor
1921 Fortunato 3. "Der letzte Atemzug", screenplay
1921 Die Tochter Ahasvers: "Das flackernde Licht", screenplay, actor
1921 Die Tochter Ahasvers: "Höllenreigen", screenplay
1921/1922 The Romance of a Poor Sinner, screenplay

References

External links 

 Leo Koffler at filmportal.de

1879 births
1931 deaths
Austrian Jews
Austrian expatriates in France
Austrian emigrants to Germany
Austrian people of Jewish descent
Austro-Hungarian military personnel of World War I
Film people from Berlin
Male actors from Vienna
Male actors from Berlin
Musicians from Vienna
Singers from Berlin
20th-century German male actors